The Universidad del Tepeyac is a university located north of Mexico City and was founded in 1975.

Universities in Mexico City
Educational institutions established in 1975